Tapfumaneyi Mandizha (born 27 June 1985) is a Zimbabwean cricketer. He made his first-class debut for Midlands cricket team in the 2003–04 Logan Cup on 19 March 2004.

References

External links
 

1985 births
Living people
Zimbabwean cricketers
Centrals cricketers
Midlands cricketers
Sportspeople from Harare